Rissoina rissoi is a species of minute sea snail, a marine gastropod mollusk or micromollusk in the family Rissoinidae.

Description

Distribution
This species occurs in the Red Sea and in the Indian Ocean off Madagascar.

References

 Dautzenberg, Ph. (1929). Contribution à l'étude de la faune de Madagascar: Mollusca marina testacea. Faune des colonies françaises, III (fasc. 4). Société d'Editions géographiques, maritimes et coloniales: Paris. 321-636, plates IV-VII pp.

Rissoinidae
Gastropods described in 1827